"Everyday" is a song recorded by Chilean-Swedish singer DJ Méndez. The song was released as a digital download on 26 February 2018 and peaked at number five on the Swedish Singles Chart. Méndez took part with this song in Melodifestivalen 2018, and qualified to the Andra Chansen round from the third semi-final on 17 February 2018. In the Andra Chansen round, it beat Sigrid Bernson's song Patrick Swayze to qualify for the grand final. In the final, it performed first but finished last in the results.

It was written by Méndez along with Jimmy Jansson and Palle Hammarlund.

Track listing

Charts

Weekly charts

Year-end charts

Release history

References

2018 singles
2017 songs
English-language Swedish songs
Spanish-language songs
Melodifestivalen songs of 2018
Swedish pop songs
Universal Music Group singles
Songs written by Jimmy Jansson